Ministry of National Defense (Polish: Ministerstwo Obrony Narodowej, MON) is the office of government in Poland under the Minister of National Defense. It is responsible for the organization and management of the Polish Armed Forces. During the Second Polish Republic and World War II it was called the Ministry of Military Affairs (Ministerstwo Spraw Wojskowych). Ministry budget for 2022 was  140 billion PLN.

History
The beginning of the Ministry of Defense's operations is connected with the 1775 establishment of the Military Department within the Permanent Council. In 1789, the Military Commission of the Polish–Lithuanian Commonwealth was established, and from the Constitution of 3 May 1791 was under the Guardians of the Laws. Between 1793-94, the department was restored in the Supreme National Council. When Warsaw became part of the Kingdom of Prussia after the Third Partition of Poland in 1795), the Prussian Ministry of War headquarters was moved into the local Copper-Roof Palace. Another War Ministry was established in the Duchy of Warsaw. After the establishment of the Stanisław Małachowski government on 5 October 1807, the War Directorate became the Minister of War.

From 1807 to 1810, the number of ministry officials increased from a dozen to over one hundred. The ministry's activities ceased on 4 May 1813. In 1814, the Military Organizing Committee was established in Paris to regulate the military affairs of the Kingdom of Poland in 1815. After the November Uprising and the introduction of the Organic Statute of the Kingdom of Poland in the early 1830s, the distinctiveness of the Polish defence establishment from the Ministry of War of the Russian Empire ceased to exist. On 30 January 1917, the Provisional Council of State created an acting military commission, which was to deal with Polish military matters until a war office was organized.

On 2 November 1918, the commission was transformed into the Ministry of Military Affairs, based at the Copper-Roof Palace. During the London emigration of Polish power during World War II, on November 30, 1942, the name of the Ministry of Military Affairs was changed to the Ministry of National Defense. In 1944, under the Polish Committee of National Liberation under the communists controlled a National Defense Center to manage the war front. After the war, the Provisional Government of National Unity (TRJN) reestablished the Military Affairs Ministry, which would be replaced by the Ministry of National Defense in 1979 and was under the Polish People's Army (LWP) in the People's Republic of Poland. The ministry would be transferred from the LWP to the Polish Army in 1990.

Organizational structure
The ministry includes political departments, Cabinet of the Minister and the following organizational units including units P1-P8 forming Polish General Staff:

 Operational Center
 Administrative Department
 Budget Department
 Department of Education, Culture and Heritage
 Department of Infrastructure
 Personnel Department
 Department of Control
 Department of Cyber Security
 Department of Protection of Classified Information
 Department of International Security Policy
 Armaments Policy Department
 Law Department
 Department of Social Affairs
 Department of Strategy and Defense Planning
 Department of Military Education
 Department of Military Health Service
 Department of Military Foreign Affairs
 Office of the General Director
 Office of the Minister of National Defence
 Offset Contracts Office
 Management Board of the Organization and Additions (P1)
 Management of Intelligence and Reconnaissance Intelligence (P2)
 Armed Forces Planning and Training Management Board (P3/P7)
 Logistics Management (P4)
 Management Board of Armed Forces Development Planning and Programming (P5)
 Management and Command Board (P6)
 Material Planning Board (P8)
 Military Information Services
 Internal Military Service
 Military Intelligence Service

Units subordinate to the MON:

 Armed Forces General Command
 Operational Command 
 Support Command
 Military Gendarmerie
 Territorial Defence Force
 Warsaw Garrison Command
 National Center for Kryptologii 
 Provincial Military Headquarters 
 Center of Monitoring and Analysis 
 Inspectorate of Armaments
 Innovative Defense Technology 
 Inspectorate of Military Fires 
 Military Centre for Standardization, Quality and Codification 
 Military Centre of Metrology
 National Military Representative to NATO
 Internal Audit for the Energy Sector
 Military Technical Supervision
 Military Studies of Teaching Foreign Languages 
 Central Military-Medical Commission 
 Military Pension Offices 
 House of the Retired Military Personnel (Warsaw)
 Registration Office of the Polish Army

Ministers
Second Polish Republic
 Brigadier general Edward Rydz-Śmigły (1918)
 (acting) Major general Jan Wroczyński (1918–1919)
 Major general Józef Leśniewski (1919–1920)
 Major general Kazimierz Sosnkowski (1921–1923)
 (acting) Major general Aleksander Osiński (1923)
 Major general Władysław Sikorski (1924–1925)
 Lieutenant general Lucjan Żeligowski (1925–1926)
 Major general Juliusz Tadeusz Tarnawa-Malczewski (1926)
 Marshal of Poland Józef Piłsudski (1926–1935)
 Major general Tadeusz Kasprzycki (1935–1939)

Polish government-in-exile
 Lieutenant general Władysław Sikorski (1939–1942)
 Major general Marian Kukiel (1942–1944)

Republic of Poland / People's Republic of Poland
 Marshal of Poland Michał Rola-Żymierski (1945–1949)
 Marshal of Poland/Marshal of the Soviet Union Konstantin Rokossovsky (1949–1956)
 Marshal of Poland Marian Spychalski (1956–1968)
 Army General Wojciech Jaruzelski (1968–1983)
 Army General Florian Siwicki  (1983–1989)

Third Polish Republic
 Army General Florian Siwicki  (1989–1990)
 Vice Admiral Piotr Kołodziejczyk (1990–1991)
 Jan Parys (December 23, 1991 – 1992)
 (acting) Romuald Szeremietiew (1992)
 Janusz Onyszkiewicz (1992–1993)
 Piotr Kołodziejczyk (1993–1994)
 (acting)  Jerzy Milewski (1994–1995)
 Zbigniew Okoński (1995)
 Stanisław Dobrzański (1996–1997)
 Janusz Onyszkiewicz (1997–2000)
 Bronisław Komorowski (2000–2001)
 Jerzy Szmajdziński (October 19, 2001 – October 31, 2005)
 Radosław Sikorski (October 31, 2005 – February 7, 2007)
 Aleksander Szczygło (February 7, 2007 – November 16, 2007 excluding 7–9 October 2007)
 Jarosław Kaczyński (7–9 October 2007 as Prime Minister and Minister of ND)
 Bogdan Klich (November 16, 2007 – July 29, 2011)
 Tomasz Siemoniak (August 2, 2011 – November 12, 2015)
 Antoni Macierewicz (November 16, 2015 – January 9, 2018)
 Mariusz Błaszczak (January 9, 2018 – present)

See also
 Polish Armed Forces
 Ministries of Poland
 Wydawnictwo MON

References

External links

 

Poland
National Defence
Poland, National Defence
Military of Poland
1918 establishments in Poland
Poland
Poland